Abraham Gutt (אברהם גוט; born March 10, 1944) is an Israeli former basketball player. He played the forward position. He played 13 seasons in the Israeli Basketball Premier League, competed for the Israeli national basketball team, and won a silver medal with Team Israel in basketball in the 1961 Maccabiah Games.

Sports career

Abraham (Rami) Gutt is 1.96 m (6 ft 5 in) tall. He enlisted in the Israel Defense Forces, and played on the IDF basketball team.

He played 13 seasons in the Israeli Basketball Premier League for Hapoel Tel Aviv.

Gutt played for the Israeli national basketball team in the 1961 Maccabiah Games (winning a silver medal), 1963 European Championship for Men, 1965 European Championship for Men, 1966 Asian Games (winning a gold medal), and 1967 European Championship for Men.

References 

1944 births
Israeli men's basketball players
Hapoel Tel Aviv B.C. players
Israeli Basketball Premier League players
Asian Games medalists in basketball
Basketball players at the 1966 Asian Games
Asian Games gold medalists for Israel
Medalists at the 1966 Asian Games
Competitors at the 1961 Maccabiah Games
Maccabiah Games basketball players of Israel
Maccabiah Games silver medalists for Israel
20th-century Israeli military personnel

Living people